Jane Myron was an American politician and restaurateur who served as mayor of Johnson City, Tennessee, from 2009 to 2011.

Early life and education 
Myron was born on September 13, 1950, in Nashville, Tennessee. She earned a Bachelor of Arts degree in Home Economics from University of Tennessee and was a member of St. Mary's Catholic Church.

Career 
A small business-owner, Myron was the owner of Jane's Lunchbox, a luncheonette specializing in health-conscious traditional Appalachian home-style cuisine.

Myron became Mayor of Johnson City when incumbent, Phil Roe, resigned after winning a seat in the United States House of Representatives. Prior to becoming mayor, Myron had been serving as Vice Mayor from 2007 to 2009. On January 29, 2009, she announced her candidacy for re-election to a four-year term as City Commissioner.

Myron's commission term expired in May 2013. She was succeeded as Mayor by Ralph Van Brocklin.

Death 
Myron died on March 10, 2020, in Franklin, Tennessee, at the age of 69.

References

External links
Tennessee Municipal League Board
Mayor Phil Roe, Vice Mayor Jane Myron accepting the Local Government Watershed Stewardship Award
Vice Mayor Jane Myron and Health Commissioner Susan Cooper 11/2/2007

Mayors of places in Tennessee
Women mayors of places in Tennessee
People from Johnson City, Tennessee
University of Tennessee alumni
1950 births
2020 deaths
People from Nashville, Tennessee
21st-century American women